Vadim Stanislavovich Nikonov (born 9 August 1948) is a retired Soviet football player and a current Russian coach.

Honours
 Soviet Cup winner: 1968, 1972.
 Top 33 players year-end list: 1974.

International career
Nikonov made his debut for USSR on March 28, 1973 in a friendly against Bulgaria.

External links
  Profile

1948 births
Living people
Russian footballers
Soviet footballers
Soviet Union international footballers
Soviet Top League players
FC Torpedo Moscow players
FC Fakel Voronezh players
PFC CSKA Moscow players
Footballers from Moscow
Russian football managers
FC Moscow managers
Russian Premier League managers
Association football midfielders
FC Spartak Ryazan players